Javier Eduardo Gómez Pineda (born 16 October 1991 in Sogamoso) is a Colombian former professional cyclist.

Major results
2011
1st Stage 1 Clásico RCN
2012
1st Stage 6 Vuelta a Guatemala
2013
1st Stage 8 Vuelta a Bolivia

References

External links

1991 births
Living people
Colombian male cyclists
People from Sogamoso
Sportspeople from Boyacá Department
21st-century Colombian people